Laza is a village and municipality in the Qabala Rayon of Azerbaijan.  It has a population of 2,025.
Ethnic Lezgins live in the village.

References 

Populated places in Qabala District